Promyllantor is a genus of eels in the family Congridae.

Species
There are currently three recognized species in this genus:

 Promyllantor adenensis (Klausewitz, 1991)
 Promyllantor atlanticus Karmovskaya, 2006
 Promyllantor purpureus Alcock, 1890

References

Congridae